St Michael's Church in the Tasman District is an Anglican church, and was the first church in the wider Nelson Region. It is a Category I heritage building.

History
A church service was first held in the shed of John Kerr's father on 4 December 1842. Two of his neighbours, Saxton and Tytler, gave land for a church and vicarage, and the first service was held in the church on 24 December 1843. The church was the first church in the Nelson Province.

A building committee decided on building a new church and in May 1866, it appointed Thomas Brunner as the architect. The foundation stone for the new church was laid on 24 November 1866, and the ceremony was attended by many prominent people: Colonel Mathew Richmond, Sir David Monro, Arthur Seymour, Brunner as the architect, Edward Baigent, with the service conducted by Bishop Selwyn. The foundation stone was laid by Mrs Blundell. The committee decided on Christmas Day of 1866 that a memorial tablet to Captain Francis H. Blundell was necessary, as he had been one of the driving forces behind the new church building. It was probably New Zealand's first memorial church. Blundell was an immediate neighbour to the church and had died in 1865; he is buried in the church's graveyard on land that he gifted. The first service was held in the new church in July 1867. The new Bishop of Nelson, Andrew Suter, was due to arrive later in the year, and hence the church was not consecrated until 13 November 1867.

The church community tried to sell the old church, but received no suitable offers. It was used by Mrs Blundell as a Sunday school until it was blown over in high winds.

On 5 April 1984, St Michael's was registered with the New Zealand Historic Places Trust as a Category I structure with registration number 248.

St Michael's is located on Waimea West Road within Brightwater (also known as Waimea West), just south of the boundary to Appleby.

Bibliography

References

Heritage New Zealand Category 1 historic places in the Tasman Region
Anglican churches in New Zealand
Churches completed in 1866
1866 establishments in New Zealand
Anglo-Catholic churches in New Zealand
1860s architecture in New Zealand